Year 548 (DXLVIII) was a leap year starting on Wednesday (link will display the full calendar) of the Julian calendar. The denomination 548 for this year has been used since the early medieval period, when the Anno Domini calendar era became the prevalent method in Europe for naming years.

Events 
 By place 
 Byzantine Empire 
 June 28 – Empress Theodora I dies at age 48, probably of breast cancer (according to Bishop Victor of Tunnuna). Her body is buried in the Church of the Holy Apostles (Constantinople).
 Emperor Justinian I relieves Belisarius from military service, in favour of 70-year-old Byzantine general Narses.

 Europe 
 Theudigisel, Visigothic general, proclaims himself ruler over the Visigothic Kingdom, after King Theudis is assassinated.

 Persia 
 Lazic War: King Gubazes II revolts against the Persians, and requests aid from Justinian I. He sends a Byzantine expeditionary force (8,000 men) to Lazica (modern Georgia).
 Gubazes II besieges the fortress of Petra, located on the Black Sea. The Persian army under Mermeroes defeats a small Byzantine force guarding the mountain passes, and relieves Petra.
 Mermeroes stations a garrison of 3,000 men in the stronghold of Petra, and marches to Armenia. The Persians, lacking sufficient supplies, secure the supply routes and plunder Lazica.

 Africa 
 Spring – Battle of the Fields of Cato: The Byzantine army, under John Troglita, crushes the Moorish revolt in Byzacena (Tunisia).

 Asia 
 April 13 – Emperor Lý Nam Đế of Vietnam is killed by Laotian tribesmen, while on retreat from the Hong River Plain. He is succeeded by his elder brother Lý Thiên Bảo.

 By topic 
 Commerce 
 Cosmas Indicopleustes, Alexandrian merchant, writes his work Christian Topography. He describes the importance of the spice trade (especially in cloves and sweet aloes) in Ceylon, and the harvesting of pepper in India (approximate date).

 Religion 
 Saint Catherine's Monastery is established in the Sinai Peninsula.

Births 
 Xiao Zhuang, crown prince of the Southern Dynasties (approximate date)

Deaths 
 April 13 – Lý Nam Đế, emperor of Vietnam
 June 3 – Clotilde, Christian wife of Clovis I and ancestress of the succeeding Merovingian dynasty (b.474)
 June 28 – Theodora I, Byzantine Empress
 Carcasan, king of the Ifuraces (Algeria)
 Chen Daoten, father of Xuan Di (or 549)
 Theudebert I, king of Austrasia (or 547)
 Theudis, king of the Visigoths

References